Mirza Tahir may refer to:

Mirza Tahir Ahmad (1928–2003), fourth leader of the Ahmadiyya Muslim Community
Mirza Tahir Hussain (born 1970), British man who spent 18 years on death row in Pakistan
Mirza Ulugh Tahir (1830–1857), Mughal prince

See also
Tahir Mirza (1936–2007), Pakistani journalist 
Mirza Tahir, Punjab, a village in Pakistan